Gustav Heinrich Eduard Moog (28 June 1908 – 9 May 1989) was a German actor. He appeared in more than seventy films from 1943 to 1989.

Filmography

References

External links 

 Audio recording with Heinz Moog in the Online Archive of the Österreichische Mediathek (Interview in German). Retrieved 18 September 2019

1908 births
1989 deaths
German male film actors